George Washington Temple (1847–1917) was an American politician in the state of Washington. He served in the Washington House of Representatives from 1893 to 1897.

Temple grew up in Hanover, Ohio, where by 1863 he was a steamboat pilot. Between 1872 and 1880 he ran a business in Norborne, Missouri, and in October 1876, Temple married Jennie Florence Wilson (1853 – after 1923) in Ray County, Missouri. Their daughter Myrtle Lena (1877–1879) died as an infant. In 1883, Temple founded and presided over a bank in Sheldon, Missouri. In 1889, Jennie and he moved to Spokane, Washington. After his service in the legislator, he was postmaster of the Spokane office.

By 1907, the Temples had moved to Southern California, where they lived in Los Angeles, Fresno and Pomona. George, Jennie and Myrtle Temple are entombed in the Inglewood Mausoleum.

References

1847 births
1917 deaths
Republican Party members of the Washington House of Representatives
People from Hanoverton, Ohio